Bix was a web service that was best known for its online competitions. The site provided self-service tools for the creation of contests.  After a user created the contest, other members could enter and vote on the outcome of those contests.  The company was founded in February 2006 and received venture funding from Trinity Ventures and Sutter Hill Ventures.

The website officially launched in July 2006 with a web-based video recorder that merged a user's karaoke performance to create a contest entry.  The site received strong praise from industry experts including Walt Mossberg of the WSJ.  Within a few months the site opened up contests for audio karaoke, videos, photos and text.  In November 2006 the site switched to a faceoff style voting system, increasing votes from 5000 a day to 150,000 a day.  Site votes reached as much as 1,000,000 in a day in 2007.  Users voted 25 times per visit on average.

Bix's competitors included Singshot (discontinued) and Worth1000.

History
Bix was also a BBS and website sponsored by Byte Magazine (BIX = "Byte Information Exchange"), rather like a social media site before such became popular.  The website survived for a short time after the magazine ceased publication in 2001 (there was a July issue, but no August issue that year).  The site had forums for virtually every known computer language, most major computing topics of interest, and each forum was run by relatively well-known people in the industry.  The site was rather like a bulletin board system, and by current standards was rather crude, but it was very popular at the time.

Yahoo! acquisition
Yahoo! acquired Bix on November 16, 2006. The company moved from downtown Palo Alto to Yahoo's main campus in March 2007.  Bix generated revenue by running contests for corporate clients.  Customers included Extra (TV series), Black Entertainment Television, The Game, Capitol Records and Electronic Arts.

Bix was shut down by Yahoo June 30, 2009.

Patents for Bix
 Automated Reward Management for Network-Based Contests
 Network Based Content Creation
 Automated Administration of Networked-Based Contests

References

Further reading
 Automata, Languages and Programming. pp. 339– . 
 Bruno, Antony (August 2009). "Check the Mic". Billboard.

American entertainment websites
Discontinued Yahoo! services
Internet properties disestablished in 2009
Internet properties established in 2006
Companies based in Sunnyvale, California